Hypotia syrtalis is a species of snout moth in the genus Hypotia. It was described by Ragonot in 1887, and is known from Israel, Egypt and Tunisia.

The wingspan is about 13 mm for males and 23 mm for females.

References

Moths described in 1887
Hypotiini